Fleur Bougourd is an indoor and lawn bowler representing Guernsey.

Bougourd won the Women's singles at the 1990 World Indoor Bowls Championship defeating Liz Wren of Scotland in the final.

References

Living people
Guernsey female bowls players
Bowls players at the 1986 Commonwealth Games
Commonwealth Games competitors for Guernsey
Year of birth missing (living people)
Indoor Bowls World Champions